The Gandoura, also Gandura, is a kind of light tunic, in wool or cotton, with or without sleeves. It normally comes in colored stripes, or more simply white, and is worn primarily in North Africa and West Africa, where it is known by the misnomer djellaba or jalabiya. The term gandoura is Berber in origin. In Algeria, there are two varieties of gandoura. The first is worn by women and is also known as Jebba Fergani. It is a traditional Algerian garment made of thick velvet that originated in the Constantine region. The other form of gandoura is one worn by Algerian men; it is a casual clothing similar to the Jellaba but it lacks a hood.

See also
 Djellaba
 Burnous
 Fez

References

Moroccan clothing
Robes and cloaks
Algerian clothing